The Leghorn,  or Livornese, is a breed of chicken originating in Tuscany, in central Italy. Birds were first exported to North America in 1828 from the Tuscan port city of Livorno, on the western coast of Italy. They were initially called "Italians", but by 1865 the breed was known as "Leghorn", the traditional anglicisation of "Livorno". The breed was introduced to Britain from the United States in 1870. White Leghorns are commonly used as layer chickens in many countries of the world. Other Leghorn varieties are less common.

History 

The origins of the Leghorn are not clear; it appears to derive from light breeds originating in rural Tuscany. The name comes from Leghorn, the traditional anglicisation of Livorno, the Tuscan port from which the first birds were exported to North America. The date of the first exports is variously reported as 1828, "about 1830" and 1852. They were initially known as "Italians"; they were first referred to as "Leghorns" in 1865, in Worcester, Massachusetts.

The Leghorn was included in the American Standard of Perfection in 1874, with three colours: black, white and brown (light and dark).  Rose comb light and dark brown were added in 1883, and rose comb white in 1886. Single comb buff and silver followed in 1894, and red, black-tailed red, and Columbian in 1929. In 1981 rose comb black, buff, silver, and golden duckwing were added.

The breed was first introduced to Britain from the United States in 1870, and from there re-exported to Italy. White Leghorns that had won first prize at the 1868 New York Show were imported to Britain in 1870, and brown Leghorns from 1872. These birds were small, not exceeding  in weight; weight was increased by cross-breeding with Minorca and Malay stock. Pyle Leghorns were first bred in Britain in the 1880s; gold and silver duckwings originated there a few years later, from crosses with Phoenix or Japanese Yokohama birds. Buff Leghorns were first seen in Denmark in 1885, and in England in 1888.

Characteristics 

In Italy, where the Livorno breed standard is recent, ten colour varieties are recognised. There is a separate Italian standard for the German Leghorn variety, the Italiana (German: Italiener). The Fédération française des volailles (the French poultry federation) divides the breed into four types: the American white, the English white, the old type (golden-salmon) and the modern type, for which seventeen colour variants are listed for full-size birds, and fourteen for bantams; it also recognises an autosexing variety, the Cream Legbar. Both the American Poultry Association and the American Bantam Association recognize a number of Leghorn varieties including white, red, black-tailed red, light brown, dark brown, black, buff, Columbian, buff Columbian, barred, and silver. In Britain, the Leghorn Club recognises eighteen colours: golden duckwing, silver duckwing, partridge, brown, buff, exchequer, Columbian, pyle, white, black, blue, mottled, cuckoo, blue-red, lavender, red, crele, and buff Columbian. Most Leghorns have single combs; a rose comb is permitted in some countries, but not in Italy. The legs are bright yellow, and the ear-lobes white.

Use 

Leghorns are good layers of white eggs, laying an average of 280 per year and sometimes reaching 300–320, with a weight of at least . White Leghorns have been much used to create highly productive egg-laying hybrids for commercial and industrial operations.

Notes

References 

Chicken breeds
Chicken breeds originating in Italy
Animal breeds on the RBST Watchlist